Serhat Koç (born 18 July 1990) is a Dutch former professional footballer who plays for KFC Esperanza Pelt.

Career
Born in Eindhoven, Koç made his first first team appearance on 11 January 2008 against FC Volendam.

On 10 December 2008, he agreed on a transfer to FC Groningen. He joined his new club in July 2009. From August 2010 he played on loan for first division club SC Cambuur until January 2011. From then he joined FC Eindhoven on loan until the end of the season. In July 2011, Koc was transferred back to FC Eindhoven on a permanent basis. Koc immediately delivered with a goal and an assist in the first game of the new season, during Eindhoven's 3–0 win on FC Emmen. After two seasons he signed with Helmond Sport in the summer of 2013. He signed with Turkish side Sanliurfaspor in July 2014. However, he left the club in December 2014 and signed with Dutch Hoofdklasse side DOVO.

Ahead of the 2019-20 season, Koç joined Belgian club KFC Esperanza Pelt.

Career statistics

Club

References

External links
 Voetbal International profile 
 

Living people
1990 births
Footballers from Eindhoven
Association football forwards
Dutch footballers
Dutch expatriate footballers
Eredivisie players
Eerste Divisie players
Tweede Divisie players
FC Eindhoven players
FC Groningen players
SC Cambuur players
VV DOVO players
Helmond Sport players
Şanlıurfaspor footballers
Royal Cappellen F.C. players
SV TEC players
Dutch people of Turkish descent
Netherlands youth international footballers
Dutch expatriate sportspeople in Belgium
Expatriate footballers in Belgium